HP Networking products include:
 Fixed configuration Ethernet switches including stackable switches.
 Modular Chassis switches
 Wide area network routers
 Wireless access points, adapters, and connectivity products
 Internet access gateways and firewalls, both wired and wireless
 Network management applications
 Network security platforms including the TippingPoint Intrusion Prevention System.
 IP Telephony applications including PBX and CTI solutions.

HP Networking arranged its products into four primary product series:
 A-Series: Data center, campus and branch network switches and routers. Predominantly heritage H3C.
 E-Series: Campus and branch network switches, voice, and wireless products. Mix of heritage ProCurve and 3Com.
 V-Series: Small business smart managed and unmanaged switches and wireless products. Mix of heritage ProCurve and 3Com.
 S-Series: Enterprise and small business security products. Heritage TippingPoint.

Below is a summary of key products.

Modular Ethernet switches
 A12500
 A9500
 A7500 - 4-, 5-, 8, and 12-slot configurations with optional dual fabric modules. One model with 8 vertical slots. Of total slots, two reserved for fabrics. Backplane capacity 2.88 Terabit-per-second. Up to 24 10GE ports or 480 Gigabit ports, with optional PoE.
 E8200 zl - (Released September 2007) Core switch offering, 12-module slot chassis with dual fabric modules and options for dual management modules and system support modules for high availability (HA). IPV6-ready, 692 Gbit/s fabric. Up to 48 10GbE ports, 288 Gb ports, or 288 SFPs. Powered by a combination of either 875W or 1500W PSU's, to provide a maximum of 3600W (5400W using additional powersupplies) of power for PoE.
 E5400 zl - Chassis based, Layer 3, in either 6 or 12 slot bays. Supports up to 48 10GE ports, 288 Gb ports, or 288 SFPs. Powered by a combination of either 875W or 1500W PSU's, to provide a maximum of 3600W (5400W using additional powersupplies) of power for PoE.
 E4200 vl - Chassis based, in either 4 or 8 slot bays. Supports up to 192 10/100 ports or 128 Gb ports, or 32 SFP

Fixed-üort Ethernet switches

Fixed-port L3 managed Ethernet switches
 A5820
 A5810
 A5800
 A5500 EI - Gigabit switches.  Models - 24-Port; 48-Port; 24-Port PoE; 48-Port PoE; 24-Port SFP; 24-Port DC; 24-Port SFP DC.  Full Layer 3 (static routes, RIP, multicast routing (OSPF, PIM).  Stackable to 9-units high with IRF stacking technology; max stacking bandwidth 96Gbit/s with four high bandwidth ports dedicated to stacking on each unit (4 ports x 12 Gbit/s stacking bandwidth x 2 full duplex).  Two expansion slots per unit with these available modules: 2-Port 10GE XFP; 1-Port 10GE XFP; 2-Port Local Connection; 2-Port Gb SFP; 2-Port SFP+.   Former 3Com H3C Switch 5500-EI.  Equivalent to HP E4800G and former 3Com Switch 4800G.
 A5500 SI
 A5120 EI
 A5120 SI
 A3610
 A3600 EI
 A3600 SI
 E6600 - (Released February 2009) Datacenter switch offered in five versions. There are four switches with either 24 or 48 Gb ports, with two models featuring four 10GbE Enhanced small form-factor pluggable transceiver (SFP+) ports. There is also a 24 port 10GbE version. All of these feature front to back cooling and removable power supplies.
 E6400 cl - Stackable switch, Layer 3, with either CX4 10GE ports or X2 10GE ports
 E6200 yl - Stackable switch, Layer 3, with 24 SFP transceiver ports, and the capability of 10GE ports
 E5500G - - Gigabit. Stackable, 24 or 48 Gb ports including 4 Dual Personality Ports (2 x Gb or SFPs). Additionally includes two dedicated 24Gbit/s stacking ports and one module expansion slot. Available modules: 2-Port 10GE XFP; 1-Port 10GE XENPAK; 8-Port Gb SFP. Layer 2 switching and Layer 3 static routing, RIP, and multicast routing (OSPF, PIM). Stackable up to 8-units high using 3Com XRN Technology, with distributed link aggregation, resilient stacking up to 96Gbit/s bandwidth, distributed routing tables, single IP address management. Two PoE models and upgradeable PoE. Single IP management clustering (basic stacking) also supported.
 E5500
 E4800G - Gigabit switches.  Models - 24-Port; 48-Port; 24-Port PoE; 48-Port PoE; 24-Port SFP.  Full Layer 3 (static routes, RIP, multicast routing (OSPF, PIM).  Stackable to 9-units high with IRF stacking technology; max stacking bandwidth 96Gbit/s with four high bandwidth ports dedicated to stacking on each unit (4 ports x 12 Gbit/s stacking bandwidth x 2 full duplex).  Two expansion slots per unit with these available modules: 2-Port 10GE XFP; 1-Port 10GE XFP; 2-Port Local Connection; 2-Port Gb SFP; 2-Port SFP+.   Former 3Com Switch 4800G.  Equivalent to HP A5500-EI, former 3Com H3C Switch 5500-EI.
 E4510G
 E4500G - - Gigabit. 24 or 48 Gb ports including 4 Dual Personality Ports (2 x Gb or SFPs). Additionally includes two module expansion slots. Available modules: 2-Port 10GE XFP; 1-Port 10GE XFP; 2-Port Local Connection. Two PoE models. Supports Layer 2 switching and Layer 3 static routing, RIP. Single IP management clustering basic stacking supported.
 E4500 Fast Ethernet. 26- and 50-port models. Two PoE models. Stackable, 24 or 48 10/100 ports plus 4 Dual Personality Ports (2 x Gb or SFPs). Supports Layer 2 switching and Layer 3 static routing, and RIP. Stackable up to 8-units high using Gigabit ports with distributed link aggregation, single IP address management. Single IP management clustering (basic stacking) also supported.
 E3500yl - Layer 3, 20 or 44 Gb port switch with PoE functionality, and 4 x Dual Personality Ports (2 x Gb or SFPs). Also capable of supporting 10GE ports. Four Stackable, Layer 3, 20 or 44 10/100 port switches with two models supportingPoE functionality, and 4 x Dual Personality Ports (2 x Gb or SFPs).

Fixed-port L2/L2+ managed Ethernet switches
 E4210G
 E4210 - Fast Ethernet. 9-, 18-, 26-, and 52-port models. Three PoE models. 10/100 ports plus one (9-port model) or two (all others) Dual Personality Ports (Gb or SFPs). Supports Layer 2 switching only. Single IP management clustering basic stacking supported.  Former 3Com Switch 4210.
 E2915
 E2615
 E2520
 A3100 EI Fast Ethernet.  Layer 2.  Former 3Com/H3C Switch 3100-EI.
 A3100 SI Fast Ethernet.  Layer 2.  Former 3Com/H3C Switch 3100-SI.

Fixed-port smart web-managed Ethernet switches
"Smart managed" switches support a web interface for changing unit configuration. In HP switches, they do not have a full Command Line Interface (CLI) and do not support remote access via Telnet.  They are marketed for Small Business environments.
 V1910 - Gigabit. 16, 24 or 48 Gb ports plus 4 SFPs). Two 24-port PoE models: one with 165 Watts PoE power; one with 370 Watts PoE power. All support Layer 2 plus Layer 3 static routes. ACLs. 802.1X. STP/RSTP/MSTP. Formerly 3Com Baseline Plus 2900.
 V1810 - Gigabit. 8 or 24 Gb ports. 24-port has 2 combo SFP ports. Layer 2 only.  Heritage ProCurve.
 V1905 - Fast Ethernet. 26- and 50-port models, each includes 2x Gigabit uplink ports. One PoE 24-port model. All Layer 2 switching only. Formerly 3Com Baseline Plus 2200 / 2400.
 V1900
 V1700 series - 10/100. 7- ports plus 1 Gb or 22 10/100 ports plus 2 Gb. The 1700-24 also has 2 Dual Personality Ports (2 x Gb or SFPs). No CLI or SNMP management.
 IntelliJack - In-the-wall switch with four Gigabit ports facing outwards and one additional Gigabit port uplink.  Also the units have two "passthrough ports" that take an "inside connection" and provides a port on the outside of the unit.  Can be powered locally or with downstream PoE power.  If powered by PoE+ of a compatible HP switch, then up to two outside ports can pass IEEE 802.1af power to attached devices.

Fixed-port unmanaged Ethernet switches
 V1410 switches - unmanaged switches.  Two Gigabit switch models - 8- and 24-port.  Heritage ProCurve.  HP Lifetime Warranty.
 V1405 switches - unmanaged switches.  Three rackmount Gigabit switches - 16- and 24-port, one PoE model; these former 3Com Baseline 2800.  Three rackmount Fast Ethernet switches - 16-, 24-, 24+2; former 3Com Baseline 2000.  Four compact unmanaged switches "C-models"; former 3Com OfficeConnect switches.
 V1405 small offices switches - unmanaged switches, three Gigabit speeds and three Fast Ethernet.  5-, 8-, 16-port.  Class B certified for office or home use.

Blade switches
 6120G/XG Blade Switch
 6120XG Blade Switch

Wireless mobility products

Wireless access points
 A-802.11a/b/g Access Points
 A-802.11n Access Points
 E-802.11n Dual Radio Access Points
 E-802.11n Single Radio and Dual Radio n/abg Access Points
 E-MSM317 Access Devices
 E802.11a/b/g Access Points
 E-Mobility Integrated Services Access Points
 V-M200 802.11n Access Points

Wireless controllers
 A3000G Wireless Switch
 A-WX5000 Access Controller
 E-Series MultiService Mobility (MSM) Controllers
 MSM310 - Single 802.11a/b/g radio. Includes 2.4 GHz dipole antennas
 MSM310-R - External use. Single 802.11a/b/g radio. Includes 2.4 GHz dipole antennas
 MSM313 - Integrated MSM Controller + single radio Access Point
 MSM313-R - External Use. Integrated MSM Controller + single radio Access Point
 MSM317 - Single 802.11b/g radio, with integrated 4 port switch
 MSM320 - Dual radios (802.11a/b/g + 802.11a/b/g) for outdoor deployment options. Includes 2.4 GHz dipole antennas. Requires PoE.
 MSM320-R - External use. Dual radios (802.11a/b/g + 802.11a/b/g). Includes 2.4 GHz dipole antennas. Requires PoE.
 MSM323 - Integrated MSM Controller + dual radio Access point.
 MSM323-R - External Use. Integrated MSM Controller + dual radio Access point.
 MSM325 - Dual radios (802.11a/b/g + 802.11a/b/g) including RF security sensor. Requires PoE
 MSM335 - Triple radios (802.11a/b/g + 802.11a/b/g + 802.11a/b/g RF security sensor)
 MSM410 - Single 802.11 a/b/g/n radio. Requires PoE. Internal antenna only.
 MSM422 - Dual-radio 802.11n + 802.11a/b/g.
The MSM Access and Mobility Controllers supports security, roaming and quality of service across MSM Access Points utilising 802.11 a/b/g/n wireless technology.
 MSM710 - Supports up to 10 x MSM Access points. Supports up to 100 Guest Users.
 MSM730 - Supports up to 40 x MSM Access points. Supports up to 500 Guest Users.
 MSM750 - Supports up to 200 x MSM Access points. Supports up to 2000 Guest Users.
 MSM760 - Supports 40 x MSM Access Points, plus license support up to 200
 MSM765 - Supports 40 x MSM Access Points, plus license support up to 200. This is a module form, and based on the ProCurve ONE.

Voice solutions
IP Telephony applications including PBX and CTI solutions. HP Networking's Telecommunications solutions utilize VoIP and Session Initiation Protocol (SIP). Voice platforms include VCX and NBX.

Security

Interconnect Fabric 
 8100fl series - Chassis based, 8 or 16 slot bays. Supports up to 16 10GE ports / 160 Gb Ports / 160 SFPs.

WAN routers

Multi-service access points
The most of those access points are designed to work in controlled mode: a controller manages and provides authentication services for those AP.

Centralized wireless solution 
 Wireless Edge Services Module - Controls Radio ports, and is an integrated module that fits into ProCurve Switches 5300xl / 5400zl / 8200zl only. Redundant Module available for failover. Supports the following Radio Ports:
 RP-210 - Single 802.11b/g radio and integrated antenna
 RP-220 - Dual-radio design (one 802.11a and one 802.11b/g); plenum rated; external antennas required
 RP-230 - Dual-radio design (one 802.11a and one 802.11b/g); features internal, integrated antennas

Wireless access points 
 M110 - Single 802.11a/b/g radio
 M111 - Wireless Client Bridge including dual band antennas
 AP-530 - Wireless Access Point; Dual radios support simultaneous 802.11a and 802.11b/g transmissions. The AP-530 has two integrated radios (one of which supports 802.11a/b/g; the other of which supports 802.11b/g). The AP supports the Wireless Distribution System.
 AP-420 - Wireless Access Point; Features a single, dual-diversity 802.11b/g radio.
 AP-10ag - Wireless Access Point; Dual radios support simultaneous 802.11a and 802.11b/g transmissions.

Accessories

External power supplies 
 ProCurve 600 Redundant External Power Supply - supports one of six times Redundant Power for series 2600-PWR (not series 2600 w/o PWR), 2610, 2800, 3400cl, 6400cl and 7000dl as well as two times optional External PoE Power for series 2600-PWR, 2610-PWR or mandatory External PoE Power for series 5300 with xl 24-Port 10/100-TX PoE Module only
 ProCurve 610 External Power Supply - supports four times optional External PoE Power for series 2600-PWR, 2610-PWR, or mandatory External PoE Power for series 5300 with xl 24-Port 10/100-TX PoE Module only
 ProCurve 620 Redundant/External Power Supply - supports two times optional External PoE Power for series 3500yl and two times Redundant Power for series 2900, 3500yl and 6200yl
 ProCurve Switch zl Power Supply Shelf - supports two times optional External PoE Power for series 5400zl and 8200zl; must be additionally equipped with max. two 875W or 1500W (typical) ProCurve Switch zl Power Supplies

GBICs and optics
HP Networking has a range of Transceivers, GBICs and 10GbE Optics for use within HP switching devices.

Discontinued products

Discontinued switch models
 3400cl series - Stackable (retired), Layer 3, 20 or 44 Gb port switch, and 4 x Dual Personality Ports (2 x Gb or small form-factor pluggable transceivers). Also capable of supporting 10GE ports.
 6108 - Stackable switch, with 6 Gb ports, and a further 2 Dual Personality Gb ports (either Gb or SFPs). End of Sale.
 E2910 al - fixed port L3 switch – 24 or 48 Gb ports including four Dual Personality Ports (4 x Gb or SFPs). The 2910al supports up to four optional 10 Gigabit ports in CX4 and / or SFP+. Two versions support PoE and PoE+
 E2810 - fixed port L2 switch – Stackable, 20 or 44 Gb ports with 4 Dual Personality Ports (4 x Gb or SFPs).
 2900 series - Stackable (retired), 20 or 44 Gb(retired) ports with 4 Dual Personality Ports (2 x Gb or SFPs). Additionally includes four 10GE ports (two of which are CX-4 and 2x of which are capable of housing optional 10GE optical transceivers).
 2800 series - Stackable (retired), 20 or 44 Gb ports with 4 Dual Personality Ports (4 x Gb or SFPs).
 E2610 (including 2610-PWR models which support 802.3af PoE) - Stackable L3 switch, 12/12, 24 (Fanless for 2610-24 w/o PWR) or 48 10/100 ports, all including 2 Gb ports and 2 SFP ports (no Dual Personality).
 2600 series (including 2600-PWR models which support 802.3af PoE)(retired) - Stackable, 8, 24 or 48 10/100 ports including 1 or 2 Dual Personality Ports (1 or 2 x Gb or small form-factor pluggable transceivers).
 E2510G series - 24 or 48 Gb ports including 4 Dual Personality Ports (4 x Gb or SFPs).
 E2510 series - Fanless 24 or 48 (incl. fan) 10/100 ports including 2 Dual Personality Ports (Gb or SFPs).
 2500 series - Stackable, 12 or 24 10/100 ports with 2 proprietary Gb transceiver slots.
 1800 series - Stackable, Fanless 8 or 24 Gb ports. The 1800-24G also has 2 Dual Personality Ports (2 x Gb or SFP). No CLI or SNMP management.
 2300 series
 2124
 1400 series
 408
 1600M - stackable Layer 2 switch
 2400M - stackable Layer 2 switch
 2424M - stackable Layer 2 switch
 4000M - modular Layer 2 switch
 8000M - modular Layer 2 switch
 9400 - modular Layer 3 Router
 AP 520 - Access Point
 4100gl - modular Layer 2 switch
 2700 series - unmanaged Layer 2 switch
 9300m series - modular Layer 3 Router (relabeled Foundry Networks BigIron series)
 ProCurve Access Controller Series 700wl
 745wl
 ACM (Access Control Module) for the 5300xl only
 5300xl series - Chassis based, Layer 3, in either 4 or 8 slot bays.

ProCurve Manager 
ProCurve Manager (PCM) is a comprehensive Network Management suite for products and solutions by ProCurve Networking, a division of HP.

ProCurve Manager comes in two versions; a base version supplied both free of charge with all managed ProCurve Products and also for download, and a "Plus" version that incorporates more advanced functionality and also enables plugin support. There is a 60-day trial version including all modules existing. Both, the base and the plus version derive from the trial version and need to be activated via Internet.

The Plus version can also be implemented in HP OpenView Network Node Manager for Windows. The software ProCurve Manager is to be used predominantly for ProCurve products.

 Plugins 
 IDM (Identity Driven Manager) - Add-on Module for PCM+; contains Intranet Network Access Security using 802.1X; compatible to MicrosoftNetwork Access Protection (NAP) since Version IDM V2.3
 NIM (Network Immunity Manager) - Add-On Module for PCM+ v2.2 and above; contains Intranet Intrusion Detection and Network Behavior Anomaly Detection (NBAD) using sFlow
 PMM (ProCurve Mobility Manager') - Add-on Module for PCM+; contains Element Management for ProCurve Access Points (420/520/530) starting from Version PMM V1; WESM Modules and Radio Ports are supported since Version PMM V2. Since PMM v3, the MSM Access Points and Controllers are now supported

See also
 Aruba Networks
 ProCurve
 ProCurve Products

References

External links 
 HPE Networking

Networking hardware
Networking Products